is a railway station on the Aizu Railway Aizu Line in the town of  Minamiaizu, Minamiaizu District, Fukushima Prefecture, Japan, operated by the Aizu Railway.

Lines

Station layout
Aizu-Arakai Station has two opposed side platforms connected to the station building by a level crossing. The station is unattended.

Platforms

Adjacent stations

History
It was renamed Aizu-Arakai on July 16, 1987.

Surrounding area

Arakai Post Office
Minamiaizu Arakai Junior High School
Minamiaizu Arakai Elementary School

See also
 List of railway stations in Japan

External links

 Aizu Railway Station information 

Railway stations in Fukushima Prefecture
Aizu Line
Railway stations in Japan opened in 1947
Minamiaizu, Fukushima